Elihu Adams (May 29, 1741 – August 10, 1775) was a farmer and soldier in the Massachusetts Militia during the American Revolutionary War. He was born in Braintree to John Adams, Sr. and Susanna Boylston; his elder brothers were John Adams, the second President of the United States, and Peter Boylston Adams, who also served as a militia captain during the Revolution. He married Thankful White in 1765, and had at least two children - Susanna, born in 1766, and John, born in 1768. His home was formerly located on what is now South Franklin Street in Holbrook, then part of Old Braintree.

Adams served as captain of the Braintree Company at the siege of Boston, and as a minuteman who fought on the Concord Green in 1775. He died of dysentery on August 10, 1775, at the age of 34, and was buried at what is today known as the "Old Section" of Union Cemetery in Holbrook.

References

1741 births
1775 deaths
People from Braintree, Massachusetts
Adams political family

Massachusetts militiamen in the American Revolution
Deaths from dysentery
Burials in Massachusetts
People from Holbrook, Massachusetts